The 2016 Indian Open was a professional ranking snooker tournament that  took place between 5–9 July 2016 at the HICC Novotel Hotel in Hyderabad, India. It was the second ranking event of the 2016/2017 season.

Hyderabad hosted the event for the first time, the previous venue being Grand Hyatt in Mumbai.

Michael White was the defending champion, but he lost 1–4 against Anthony Hamilton in the held over qualifying round.

Anthony McGill won the first ranking title of his career, defeating Kyren Wilson 5–2 in the final.

Prize fund
The breakdown of prize money for this year is shown below:

 Winner: £50,000
 Runner-up: £25,000
 Semi-final: £13,500
 Quarter-final: £9,000
 Last 16: £6,000
 Last 32: £3,000
 Last 64: £2,000 

 Televised highest break: £2,000
 Total: £300,000
 
The "rolling 147 prize" for a maximum break stood at £30,000.

Wildcard round
These matches were played in Hyderabad on 5 July 2016.

Main draw

Final

Qualifying
These matches were held between 28 and 30 May 2016 at the Preston Guild Hall in Preston, England. All matches were best of 7 frames.

Century breaks

Televised stage centuries
Total: 23

 142  Mark King
 140  Robert Milkins
 137  Ryan Day
 128  David Grace
 127, 125  Anthony Hamilton
 125  Kyren Wilson
 124  Robin Hull
 116  Rory McLeod
 114, 101  Xiao Guodong
 113  Stuart Bingham

 112  Anthony McGill
 109, 101  Shaun Murphy
 109  Martin Gould
 106  Matthew Stevens
 106  Nigel Bond
 104  Sunny Akani
 104  Stephen Maguire
 104  Marco Fu
 102  Barry Hawkins
 100  Matthew Selt

Qualifying stage centuries
Total: 9

 138  Kurt Maflin
 132  Alfie Burden
 115  Duane Jones
 110  Mark Williams
 110  Stuart Bingham

 105  Luca Brecel
 101  Robbie Williams
 101  Rory McLeod
 100  Martin O'Donnell

References

2016
Indian Open
Indian Open
Sports competitions in Hyderabad, India
Indian Open